Runcorn FC was a rugby league club. Having formed in 1876 and played rugby union as members of the RFU, they joined the Northern Union in 1895, just several days after it was founded, and played in the league from 1895–96 to 1917–18.

The club was based in Runcorn, an industrial town and cargo port in Cheshire, England, on the southern bank of the River Mersey opposite Widnes.

History

Rugby Union days
In the summer of 1885, the club carried out a tour of South Wales.

In 1886, Runcorn played Warrington in the semi-final of the South West Lancashire and Border Towns Trophy. A fight between players on the pitch resulted in a player from each side being sent off. Some time later during the match, a Runcorn player was injured and when the referee refused to allow this injured player to be replaced by the previously sent off player, the Runcorn team walked off the field. At this point, the referee abandoned the match. The Cup competition committee decided that the match should be replayed. Warrington duly won this match at Southport. It was 1891 before the animosity between the clubs subsided sufficiently for them to recommence playing each other.

In March 1889, Runcorn, at the time Cheshire champions, played the touring New Zealand Maoris team before a crowd of about 9,000 at Irwell Lane Enclosure. Runcorn were led at the time by regular captain Hughie Hughes.

Club Colours
Amber & Black (1876-1884)
Myrtle Green (1884-1918)

Ground
Irwell Lane Enclosure

Runcorn join the Northern Union 
Leading up to the "Great Schism", twelve of the top Yorkshire clubs held a meeting on Tuesday, 20 August 1895, at the Mitre Hotel, Leeds, at which they agreed that they should meet with the Rugby Union to put forward the idea of forming a Northern Union, not as a complete breakaway, but a suggestion which the Union immediately rejected out of hand. 
 
On 27 August 1895 an emergency meeting of nine Lancashire clubs agreed to support their Yorkshire counterparts if they decided to break away. Runcorn was not among the nine.

Two days later on the 29 August, the representatives of these 21 clubs (by this time, Stockport had joined the others, but their representative, being unable to attend, had telegraphed the meeting requesting his club’s admission to the new organisation) met in The George Hotel, Huddersfield in the West Riding of Yorkshire, a setting which was to become famous (or infamous) in the world of rugby. And all but Dewsbury agreed to the break-away.

A further meeting was held several days later, to formalise the agreement, at which Runcorn applied to join the Northern Union, and was admitted, becoming the twenty-second member in the inaugural season's league

Northern Union
The first Northern Union season (1895–96) started on Saturday, 7 September, and Runcorn’s first match was a home game against Widnes which they won, 15–4. All 22 clubs played in a combined league, yet games against clubs in the same county were also used to provide the two separate county leagues. Runcorn finished in third position overall, and also won the Lancashire league title (Manningham won the Rugby League title and were also Yorkshire Champions, with Halifax finishing in second positions in both these competitions).

For the following five seasons (1896–97 to 1900–01 inclusive), the two counties were kept apart, each having their own Senior Competition; this after comments or complaints from several clubs about the expenses in travelling long(ish) distances. Runcorn finished in 4th, 10th, 7th, 1st and 3rd positions respectively. 
At the end of the 1900–01 season, the top seven clubs in each of the county leagues decided to break away and form a single division, and Runcorn, after finishing in 3rd position, were among this group of clubs. In season 1901–02, Runcorn finished again in 3rd position.

This formula was successful and for the following season, a second division was also formed. Runcorn remained in the top league (Division 1) of the competition which ran in this format for the next three seasons (1902–03 to 1904–05) after which the two divisions were combined. In these seasons Runcorn finishing in 4th, 16th and 18th (bottom) position.

The following season (1905–06) one single division operated, a format which would continue for many years, thus removing the possibility of Runcorn being relegated. As it was impossible for all the clubs to play each other both home and away, clubs from the same county played each other home and away, and arranged inter-county matches as and when they could. Because not all clubs played the same number of matches, positions were decided on percentage basis. Runcorn finished 10th out of the 31 clubs.

In 1906–07, Runcorn finished in 3rd position, their highest placing for several years, and a position, which history would show, was the start of a rapid decline in the club’s playing fortunes. Although in 1907, Runcorn defeated the New Zealand All Golds 9-0 in a famous game played in driving rain.

In the next eight seasons (1907–08 to 1914–15) Runcorn finished 13th, 11th, 16th, 22nd, 24th, 19th, 21st and 25th respectively. In this last season (1914–15) Runcorn finished in a very poor bottom position with no wins, only one draw and 1 point from 27 matches.

By this time the country was involved in the First World War and sporting competitions were being cancelled/abandoned. Rugby League was no exception, yet managed to organise a friendly series of Wartime Emergency Leagues. Several clubs withdrew for the duration, and some later re-joined; but those competing did so on a very limited scale, all organising their own fixtures, usually against local rivals to cut down on the travelling. Runcorn had a very poor return for their efforts finishing in 23rd out of 24 (1915–16), 22nd out of 26 (1916–17) and 21st out of 22 (1917–18). In these three seasons, Runcorn struggled, winning only five matches out of 51.

The club folded in August 1918 season.

With the full resumption of the league competition in 1919–20 Warrington signed many of the players from the recently disbanded Runcorn club.

Players of note 
These include :
Jim Butterworth, England international
 Sam Houghton (b in Runcorn – d 1920 in Runcorn) played for Runcorn at both rugby union, and professional rugby league, and for England, and Cheshire at Rugby Union
 Alf Kennedy, England international
 Joe Richardson (b circa 1877 - d November 1904) halfback who also played for Cheshire
 Harry Speakman (b 1864 in Runcorn – d 1915 Townsville, Australia) was a fine player who never played for his country. He took part in the first (unofficial) 1888 British Lions (rugby union) tour to New Zealand, and Australia, from which he never returned, instead choosing to stay, and in doing so, help to develop the game in Australia.
 Samuel Sam Walker. England international
 Edgar Wrigley (b 1886 in Masterton, New Zealand - d 1958 (aged 71) in Huddersfield, England) dual-code international rugby union, and rugby league footballer

Club colours 
Myrtle Green.

Grounds
The Rugby club played at Canal Street (also known as Irwell Lane)

When the Runcorn RFC failed to survive the ravages of the First World War, the ground was purchased by a Mr. R H Posnett, the owner of Highfield and Camden Tannery, and the works recreation club founded as Runcorn Football Club in 1918.

Coincidentally, Huyton Rugby League Club, seeking to relocate from their ground in Liverpool, moved to Canal Street under a ground sharing agreement with Runcorn F C, changing their name to Runcorn Highfield RLFC, from season 1985–86 to 1989–90 inclusive

At the end of the 1999–2000 season, the football club, struggling with massive debts and dwindling attendances, sold the ground and moved to Stobart Stadium, home of Widnes Vikings Rugby League Club, for several years before finally closing after season 2005–06.

The ground itself, by now in a dilapidated and a dangerous condition, was sold to developers and is now a housing development, the Linnets Park housing estate

Successor clubs
As mentioned above, Huyton RLFC changed their name to Runcorn Highfield and played in Runcorn between seasons 1985–86 to 1989–90 inclusive, ground sharing with Runcorn FC, using the same Canal Street ground

Runcorn ARLFC played in Runcorn in the early 2000s, moving from the start of the 2009–10 summer season (their 5th in the Summer Conference) to the Pavilions ground, on the Eastern end of Sandy Lane (between Western Point Expressway and Picow Farm Road), Runcorn. Before that they had played at various grounds including at Moore, they currently play at the heath playing fields.
They currently play in the 4th division of the North West counties league.

Records

Club Scoring Record

Club Trophies 
 Lancashire Senior Competition – winners 1899–1900
 Lancashire League (within the Rugby League) – winners 1895–96
 Rugby League table – 3rd place 1895–96, 1900–01 and 1906–07
 Championship play-off – losing semi-finalist 1906–07 (to Oldham 11–3)

Players Records 
No records available

Club League Record 

Heading Abbreviations
Pl = Games played; W = Win; D = Draw; L = Lose; PF = Points for; PA = Points against; Diff = Points difference (+ or -); Pts = League Points 
League points: for win = 2; for draw = 1; for loss = 0.

Notes
1 – Runcorn were Lancashire League Winners
2 – Salford, Runcorn, Bradford and Warrington each had 2 points deducted for a breach of the professional rules.
3 – 1901–02 also saw the introduction of the South West Lancashire League which ran until 1906–07. Only six teams competed (Wigan, Warrington, St Helens, Widnes, Leigh and Runcorn). They met home & away but if they met in the league that result counted towards the South West Lancashire League (indicated with SWLL on the List) – The SWLL was replaced by a full scale Lancashire league in 1907–08
4 – Championship Play-Off – Semifinals: Oldham (2nd) beat Runcorn (3rd) 11–3

Several fixtures & results 
The following are a selection of Runcorn’s fixtures from the seasons in which they played (semi) professional Rugby League :-

 
 

Competition Abbreviations
RL = Rugby League competition; Div 1 = Division 1 of the Rugby League completion; LSC = Lancashire Senior League Competition; WEL = Wartime Emergency League

SWLL = South West Lancashire League (a forerunner to the Lancashire League; F = Friendly match; ? = Competition unknown

CC Rx = Challenge Cup Round x; LC Rx = Lancashire Cup Competition Round x; BTCF = South West Lancashire and Border Towns Cup-Final

Notes and comments 
 1 – 1st game under the new Northern Union Organisation
 2 – Folly Fields is the stadium used by Wigan at the time until 1901. They then became sub-tenants of Springfield Park See below – Note 12.
 3 – Lowerhouse Lane is the original site of the current ground used by Widnes. It was renamed Naughton Park in 1932 in honour of club secretary, Tom Naughton – and later renamed Halton Stadium after being completely rebuilt in 1997.
 4 – Warrington Loco were a Warrington junior side
 5 – Described in a report as "Runcorn demolished Warrington Loco"
 6 – fixture and results from the book "Rugby League Challenge Cup – An illustrated history by Les Hoole"
 7 – Thornton Rangers were a junior or amateur club in Bradford
 8 – comp = ??? Possibly end of season friendly
 9 – South West Lancashire and Border Towns Cup – Final
 10 – Assume Runcorn played in this round after a win in previous round – opponent and other details unknown
 11 – also counted to SWLL championship (South West Lancashire League)
 12 – Wigan became sub-tenants of Springfield Park, which they shared with Wigan United AFC, playing their first game there on 14 September 1901 at which a crowd of 4,000 saw them beat Morecambe 12–0, and the last game on 28 April 1902 when Wigan beat the Rest of Lancashire Senior Competition. A temporary ground was necessary to span the period between moving from Folly Fields and the new ground at Central Park being constructed.
 13 – Intermediate Round in the Challenge Cup
 14 – Assume Runcorn played and won in this round to progress into round 2 – opponent and other details unknown
 15 – Widnes did not compete during seasons 1915–16 to 1918 (Sept–Dec)
 16 – Warrington did not compete during season 1915–16
 17 – Runcorn – no records after end of 1917–18 season

See also 
 British rugby league system
 1895–96 Northern Rugby Football Union season
 1896–97 Northern Rugby Football Union season
 1897–98 Northern Rugby Football Union season
 1898–99 Northern Rugby Football Union season
 1899–1900 Northern Rugby Football Union season
 1900–01 Northern Rugby Football Union season
 1901–02 Northern Rugby Football Union season
 1902–03 Northern Rugby Football Union season
 1903–04 Northern Rugby Football Union season
 1904–05 Northern Rugby Football Union season
 1905–06 Northern Rugby Football Union season
 1906–07 Northern Rugby Football Union season
 1907–08 Northern Rugby Football Union season
 1908–09 Northern Rugby Football Union season
 1909–10 Northern Rugby Football Union season
 1910–11 Northern Rugby Football Union season
 1911–12 Northern Rugby Football Union season
 1912–13 Northern Rugby Football Union season
 1913–14 Northern Rugby Football Union season
 1914–15 Northern Rugby Football Union season
 1915–16 Northern Rugby Football Union Wartime Emergency League season
 1916–17 Northern Rugby Football Union Wartime Emergency League season
 1917–18 Northern Rugby Football Union Wartime Emergency League season
 1918–19 (January) Northern Rugby Football Union Wartime Emergency League season<br/ >
 1919 (Feb-May) Northern Rugby Football Union Victory season<br/ >
 Canal Street Stadium, Runcorn<br/ >
 The Great Schism – Rugby League View
 The Great Schism – Rugby Union View
 Rugby league county leagues
 List of defunct rugby league clubs
 Runcorn Highfield RLFC
 Runcorn F.C. Halton
 Runcorn Linnets F.C.

References

External links 
1896–97 Northern Rugby Football Union season at wigan.rlfans.com
Hull&Proud Fixtures & Results 1896/1897
Widnes Vikings – One team, one passion Season In Review – 1896–97 
Saints Heritage Society
Warrington History
report in Runcorn and Widnes Weekly News

Defunct rugby league teams in England
Rugby league teams in Cheshire
Runcorn
Founder members of the Northern Rugby Football Union
Rugby league clubs disestablished in 1914